Barbora Mikuskova (born 19 January 2001) is a Slovak swimmer. She competed in the women's 50 metre freestyle event at the 2018 FINA World Swimming Championships (25 m), in Hangzhou, China.

References

2001 births
Living people
Slovak female swimmers
Slovak female freestyle swimmers
Place of birth missing (living people)
21st-century Slovak women